Andrea Plumlee is an American attorney and elected Texas family court judge, overseeing the 330th Family District Court in Dallas County, Texas. She was first elected in 2010 and re-elected in 2014 and 2018.

Plumlee earned a J.D. degree from Southern Methodist University Dedman School of Law in 1993.

See also 
 Judiciary of Texas

References 

African-American judges
American women judges
Year of birth missing (living people)
Living people
21st-century African-American people
21st-century African-American women